Lorca may refer to:

Lorquino football clubs
 CF Lorca Deportiva, founded 2012
 CF Lorca Deportiva (1969), dissolved 1994
 Lorca Atlético CF, 2010–2012
 Lorca Deportiva CF, 2002–2012
 Lorca Deportiva CF B, 2005–2009
 Lorca FC, 2003–2018
 Lorca FC B, 2012–2018

Media
 Gabriel Lorca, fictional characters from the TV series Star Trek: Discovery
 Homenaje a Federico García Lorca, a work for chamber orchestra by the Mexican composer Silvestre Revueltas
 Lorca (album), the fifth album by singer-songwriter Tim Buckley
 Tango Lorca, an American tango ensemble

People

Given name
 Lorca Van De Putte (born 1988), Belgian football defender
 Philip-Lorca diCorcia (born 1951), American photographer

Surname
 Carlos Lorca (born 1944), Chilean physician and politician
 Federico García Lorca (1898–1936), Spanish poet, playwright, and theatre director
 Juan Gonzalo Lorca (born 1985), Chilean footballer

Places
 Castle of Lorca, a Lorquino fortress of medieval origin constructed between the 9th and 15th centuries
 Federico García Lorca Granada Airport, the airport serving the province and city of Granada, Spain
 Lorca, Spain, a municipality and city in the autonomous community of Murcia
 Taifa of Lorca, a medieval Islamic Moorish taifa kingdom centered in modern southern Spain

See also 
 Llorca, a surname
 Lorcha (disambiguation)